Nybrogade 18 is an 18th-century canal house overlooking the Slotsholmen Canal in central Copenhagen, Denmark. The architect Vilhelm Tvede lived on the third floor as a child. The entire property was later owned first by him and then by his son Gotfred Tvede. It was listed in the Danish registry of protected buildings and places in 1918.

History

17th century

The property was listed in Copenhagen's first cadastre of 1689 as No. 26 in Snaren's Quarter, owned by Icelandic merchant Poul Hansen. The present building on the site was built in 1732 for Frederick IV's coachman Christen Christensen Dam and his wife Karen Sørensdatter. The property was listed in the new cadastre of 1756 as No. 17 in Snaren's Quarter and was still owned by Christen Dam at that time.

The property belonged to Girth Diderek Jørrensen at the time of the 1787 census. He worked for the Almindelige Enkekasse (General Widow's Fund). He lived there with his wife Henre Jette, their three children (aged one to eight), two nieces, a wet nurse, 43-year-old Anne Barebar	 /widow), 25-year-old Karen Lytke, a caretaker and a lodger.

18001840s
The property was later taken over by Abel Marie Sommer (née Hamon), widow of Supreme Court justice Hans Morten Sommer. The only other residents were a chamber maid (husjomfru) and a maid. She and her husband resided in the building at corner of Nytorv and Rådhusstræde at the time of the 1787 census.

The property was again listed in the new cadastre of 1806  as No. 17 in Snaren's Quarter. It was owned by one captain Berg at that time.

The architect  Gustav Friedrich Hetsch (1788-1864) lived in the building from 1818 to 1822.

The property was home to 18 residents in four households at the 1840 census. Christian Gottlieb Korn	, a senior clerk (fuldmægtig) in Rentekammeret, resided on the ground floor with his wife Ane Tobine Korn, their two children (aged three and four) and one maid.	 Gertrude Cathrine Beck, a widow, resided on the first floor with two of her children (aged 19 to 23), her sister Charlotte Frederikke Smith and one maid. Anna Charlotte Christine Thochen, a widow, resided on the second floor with her son Christian Larsen Thochen (theology student) and one maid. Ane Marie Larsen, a widow sand trader, resided in the basement with her two children (aged 16 and 18) and two lodgers. The western end of Nybrogade (at Grederiksholms Kanal) was the site of the so-called "Sandbox" /Sandkisten), a storage facility for sand. The sand was transported to the site by barge. It was then sold by the sand traders to the so-called "sandmen", who drove around with their carriages. WWomen would then call down to them from the windows: "Hey Sandman, come up with a skæppe!" (1 skæppe = 17.3 liter),

Tvede family

Johan Frederik Tvede, a master shoemaker, resided at the time of the 1850 census with his wife and two sons on the third floor. The elder of the two sons was the architect Vilhelm Tvede. He was married in 1857. The couple was at the time of the 1860 census living with their two daughters in the apartment on the second floor. Vilhelm Tvede's younger brother, Christiann, a mechanician, was still living with his parents in the apartment on the third floor. The building was at this point home to a total of 21 people.

Vilhelm Tvede is from at least 1880 mentioned as the owner of the building. His family, now with five daughters and one son, was by then occupying the first, second and third floor. The son Gotfred Tvede (1863-1947) would also become an architect. He was 31 August 1895 married to Marie Dorph Petersen, daughter of actor and theatre director Jens Frederik Siegfried Dorph Petersen. He lived in the house in Nybrogade until his death. The only other residents at the time of the 1906 census was an antiques dealer, Theodor Ludvig Schandorff, who resided with his wife and daughter in the basement.

Later history
The composer Sven Gyldmark (1904-1981) resided on the third floor from 1946 to 1956.

Architecture

Nybrogade 18 was originally constructed with three storeys over a Walk-out basement and is just four bays wide. The lower part of the roof was towards the street replaced by a  mezzanine in 1854. The front side of the building is constructed in undressed red brick, with white-painted windows, save the overground portion of the cellar which is plastered and  has blue-painted windows. Two decorative Fleur-de-lis  wall anchors are seen between the windows on the two upper floors. The main entrance is placed in a flat arched opening. The keystone and imposts of the arch are made of sandstone. The blue-painted door is topped by a transom window. The transom window is fronted by a decorative  lattice screen. The door is accessed via a short flight of granite steps.

A four-storey, perpendicular side wing, with brown-painted timber framing and bargeboards and ocre-coloured infills, extends from the rear side of the building along one side of a small courtyard. The rear side of the main wing is constructed in brick but also finished with ocre-coloured plastering. The building's main staircase is located in the side wing.

Today
The property is today owned by E/F Nybrogade 18. The basement houses a café. There is one condominium on each of the upper floors.

Gallery

References

External links

 1860 census
 1906 ensus
 Tvede
 Source

Listed residential buildings in Copenhagen
Residential buildings completed in 1732
1732 establishments in Denmark